Petar Popović (born February 14, 1959, in Orlovat, Yugoslavia) is a Serbian chess Grandmaster. FIDE awarded him the International Master title in 1977, and the Grandmaster title in 1981. His tournament results have included =1st at Pécs 1980, =1st at Novi Sad 1981, =2nd at Novi Sad 1984, =1st at Bor 1985, =2nd at Cannes 1986, =1st at Pucarevo 1987 and =4th at Belgrade 1987. He played on the Yugoslav Olympiad teams in 1986 and 1988. He drew a match with former Women's World Champion Maia Chiburdanidze (+1−1=6) in 1986.

He lives in Brussels.

Notable chess games 

Here is a sacrificial victory by Popović over Serbian grandmaster Slavoljub Marjanović:

Popović–Marjanović, Yugoslavia 1979  1.e4 c5 2.Nf3 d6 3.Nc3 a6 4.g3 Nc6 5.Bg2 g6 6.d4 cxd4 7.Nxd4 Bd7 8.Nd5 e6 9.Ne3 Qc7 10.O-O Bg7 11.Nxc6 bxc6 12.Nc4 d5 13.exd5 cxd5 14.Bxd5 Rd8 15.Bf4 Qc5 16.Nd6+ Ke7 17.c4 exd5 18.Nb7 Qxc4 19.Rc1 Qb5 20.Re1+ Be6 21.Rc7+ Ke8 22.Rxf7 Bf6 23.Rc7 Qb6 24.Qg4 Ne7 25.Rxe6 Qd4 26.Nxd8 1-0

Here is a miniature against German grandmaster Phillip Schlosser:

Popović–Schlosser, Brno 1992 1.e4 c5 2.Nf3 e6 3.d4 cxd4 4.Nxd4 a6 5.Bd3 Bc5 6.Nb3 Ba7 7.O-O Nc6 8.Qg4 Qf6 9.Nc3 Nge7 10.Bg5 Qg6 11.Qh4 Ne5 12.Be2 (12.Bxe7?? Nf3+) 1-0 Black is helpless against the dual threats of 13.Bh5, winning the queen, and 13.Bxe7.

Here is another miniature, which Andrew Soltis pronounced "the funniest master game (so far) of 1979":

Gliksman–Popović, Wroclaw 1979 1.e4 g6 2.d4 Bg7 3.Nc3 d6 4.g3 Nc6 5.d5?! Nd4 6.Be3 c5 7.Nb1 Beginning an ill-fated plan to trap Black's knight. Qb6! 8.Bc1 Bh6! 9.c3 Bg4! 10.Qa4+ After 10.Qxg4, Bxc1 will devastate White's queenside. Kf8 11.Nd2 Qa5!! 0-1 White's queen is attacked, and 12.Qxa5 allows 12...Nc2#. 11.Na3 could have led to Bxc1 12.Nc4 Bxb2! 13.Nxb6 Bxc3#. Notes based on those by Soltis.

References

External links 
 
 

1959 births
Serbian chess players
Living people
Chess grandmasters
Yugoslav chess players